Kurt Ballou (born February 1, 1974) is an American musician and producer based in Massachusetts, best known as the guitarist for hardcore punk band Converge and for his prolific recording and production work at his own GodCity Studio.

Early and personal life 
Kurt Ballou started playing saxophone in elementary school. He performed in jazz band, concert band and orchestra, dabbling between baritone saxophone, bassoon and bass clarinet. Ballou was accepted to join the Hartford School of Music, but he opted to study aerospace engineering instead. His father used to have a guitar that Ballou played occasionally, but it did not interest him until a school friend gave him Slayer tapes around the age of sixteen.

He is a vegan and follows a straight edge lifestyle.

Career 
Since 1990, Kurt Ballou has played in the metalcore band Converge. From 1996 to 2000 Ballou played in the hardcore punk band The Huguenots. From 1996 to 1999 Ballou and Stephen Brodsky played in the rock band Kid Kilowatt. In 1998 Ballou established GodCity Studio. From 1999 to 2002 Ballou and Ben Koller played in the hardcore punk band Blue/Green Heart.

God City Studio 
In the late 1990s, Kurt Ballou was working as a biomedical engineer when his then-project got cancelled. Instead of selecting a different position within the same company that he had worked with for six years, Ballou opted to receive a severance package which he used to build his own recording studio. His experiences and knowledge in engineering carry over to his recording work. In regards to Ballou's technical precision as a producer, Jacob Bannon (of Converge) has stated, "Nothing gets by him—it is inspiring to watch him work."

Established in 1998, God City Studio is located in Ballou's home state of Massachusetts. One of the earliest recordings from the studio was Cave In's Until Your Heart Stops. Ballou handled all production, engineering, and mastering for the record.

Ballou has stated that collaborating on Jane Doe with co-producer Matthew Ellard was a huge learning experience for him as an engineer and producer. Ellard jokingly stated Ballou "watched him like a hawk" during the engineering and producing process.

In 2005 Ballou remixed and remastered Converge's Petitioning the Empty Sky and When Forever Comes Crashing. Ballou has stated that because of the quality of [Converge's] recordings has improved so much that the original recordings were "becoming distracting". Ballou has also produced and co-produced several Converge albums, including 2001's Jane Doe, 2004's You Fail Me and 2006's No Heroes. He has also produced a number of independent metal and hardcore bands, including Genghis Tron's Board Up the House, Torche's Meanderthal, Disfear's Live the Storm and Darkest Hour's Godless Prophets & the Migrant Flora.

One reason that motivated Ballou to get in to the studio side of music was to have "maximum control over Converge's music." He further stated, "When we were starting out, no one wanted to help us anyway, so if we didn't take control, nothing was going to get done." Ballou has claimed to admire producers such as Ken Andrews, Martin Bisi, Fred Drake, Steve Albini, and Don Zientara.

Equipment 
Guitars commonly used: GodCity Instruments guitars, Wild Customs The Savage One w/ EMG P85 bridge pickup, First Act Custom Sheena Guitar w/ EMG 81 bridge pickup, Warmoth Custom Jazzmaster W/ EMG 89 bridge pickup, First Act Custom Offset-Horns Double-Cutaway, Rickenbacker 650A w/ EMG 81 bridge pickup.
Amps commonly used: Orange OR50 head, Sparrows Sons overdrive std (aka Sparrow amp), Bad Cat Black Cat head, Bad Cat Lynx head, Marshall 1987x Plexi Reissue, 1978 Marshall 50-watt JMP 2204, Ampeg V-4 head, Guild Thunderbass.
Speaker Enclosures commonly used: Emperor 6x12 cabinet (2), Marshall customized 4x12 cabinet w/ four "Eminence vintage 30 clone" 12-inch speakers, Marshall 8x10 cabinet w/ stock 15-watt Celestions.
Effects commonly used: Providence Stampede Distortion, Boss GE-7 Graphic Equalizer, Akai Headrush, Earthquaker Devices Avalanche Run, Boss PS-3 Pitch Shifter/Delay, Boss HM-2 Heavy Metal, TC Electronic Polytune, Boss Noise Suppressor, TC Electronic Mimiq.

Discography

With Converge 

 Halo in a Haystack (1994)
 Petitioning the Empty Sky (1996)
 When Forever Comes Crashing (1998)
 Jane Doe (2001)
 You Fail Me (2004)
 No Heroes (2006)
 Axe to Fall (2009)
 All We Love We Leave Behind (2012)
 The Dusk in Us (2017)
Bloodmoon: I (2021)

With The Huguenots 

 The Huguenots (1998) (EP)
 The Huguenots / Sevenpercentsolution (2000) (split with Sevenpercentsolution)
 Discography (2007)

With Blue/Green Heart 

 Self Esteem Through Modern Science  (2001) (EP)

With Kid Kilowatt 

 Guitar Method (2004)

As an additional/guest musician

Awards and nominations

Heavy Music Awards

!Ref.
|-
| 2018
| Himself 
| Best Producer
| 
|rowspan=1|

See also
:Category:Albums produced by Kurt Ballou

References
General

 

Specific

External links

Airbornmag.com Interview December 2007 Interview with UK-based music/sports website Airbornmag.com
Interview with Kurt Ballow
Kurt Ballou interview
First Act website, includes a page on his custom "Sheena" guitar
AMP magazine website, AMP (Kurt contributes an article to this page, entitled "Tech Talk")
Kurt's Rickenbacker 650A review (Harmony Central)
KURT BALLOU EXPLAINS HOW HE PLAYS SO GODDAMN LOUD (Noisey)

Living people
1974 births
20th-century American guitarists
21st-century American guitarists
American audio engineers
American heavy metal guitarists
American multi-instrumentalists
American punk rock guitarists
Audio production engineers
American biomedical engineers
Converge (band) members
Guitarists from Massachusetts
Hardcore punk musicians
Record producers from Massachusetts